Don Richardson may refer to:

 Don Richardson (musician), American fiddler
 Don Richardson (missionary) (1935–2018), Canadian Christian missionary and author
 Don Richardson (businessman) (1930–2007), British businessman
 Don Richardson (director) (1918–1996), American actor and director
 Don Richardson (arranger) (1928–2008), New Zealand music arranger
 Donald "Duck" Richardson (1935–2011), American basketball coach